Wang Jiaxiang (also known as Wang Jiaqiang) (August 15, 1906 – January 25, 1974), was one of the senior leaders of the Chinese Communist Party in its early stage and a member of the 28 Bolsheviks. Wang held a variety of high-level posts in the Party: during the Civil War he was the director of the Red Army's General Office, upon the founding of the People's Republic of China he was the first ambassador to the Soviet Union (and the first ever ambassador of the PRC), and then became the first head of the Party's International Department.

Political Biography

Wang, a native of Jing County, Anhui, was born into a landlord family and attended an English missionary school in Wuhu. In September 1925 he began attending the affiliated middle school of Shanghai University. One month later he joined the Youth League, and was soon en route to the Soviet Union, studying at the Moscow Sun Yat-sen University. This institution was established under Sun Yat-Sen's policy of alliance with the Soviet Union and the CCP, and named after him to train revolutionaries who would return to China.

Joining the '28 Bolsheviks' 
In Moscow, Wang joined the cohort consisting of Wang Ming, Zhang Wentian, Bo Gu and other students, called the "28 Bolsheviks" (a coalition whose precise membership is in dispute), jointly expressing a wish to engage in revolution in China.

In 1928, while still in Moscow, Wang joined the Chinese Communist Party.

With the support from their mentor Pavel Mif, the president of Moscow Sun Yat-sen University and then representative of Comintern to China, the 28 Bolsheviks were sent back to China to take leadership of the CCP. The return of the "28 Bolsheviks" began with Wang Ming and Chen Yuandao in early 1929, with Wang Jiaxiang returning in 1930.

On June 11, 1930, however, Wang was sent to Hong Kong after an abortive attempt to take control of the Party. The Bolsheviks eventually did successfully take  power over the Party after a power struggle with Li Lisan in 1930, however. Compared with his counterparts, Wang received the relatively less important task of secretary for the party newspaper and chief editor of two Party journals.

The downfall of the 'Bolsheviks' 
Wang Jiaxiang was one of the early defectors from the 'Bolsheviks', coming over to Mao's camp during the Zunyi conference in 1935 with other members Zhang Wentian and Yang Shangkun. Bo Gu was dismissed as general secretary and replaced by Zhang (though he remained a member of the Politburo), and Wang Jiaxiang rose to control the Red Army along with Mao and Zhou Enlai.

At Yan'an 
After Wang reached Yan'an, he was sent to Moscow as CCP delegate to Comintern in 1937. Wang came back the next year with an important tribute to Mao: an alleged oral message from Georgi Dimitrov, one of the leaders of Comintern at that time, that approved the CCP's united front work and endorsed Mao's leading position in the Party.

Although the authenticity of this message is still in question, Mao did exploit it as pivotal proof for the legitimacy of his being supreme leader. As a reward, Wang was appointed as Vice Chairman of Central Military Committee of CCP, replacing Mao's rival Wang Ming. During that time the Second Sino-Japanese War broke out, Chinese Red Army was reorganized into 8th Route Army, and Wang Jiaxiang was appointed as Director of Political Department, taking charge of military command with Zhu De and Peng Dehuai. At the same time, he was elected as Commissioner and member of the CCP Politburo, bringing him to his greatest prominence in the Party so far.

Promoting Mao 
In 1943 Wang was the first to promote the concept of Maoism, co-heading (with Mao) the Central Study Group in Yan'an which oversaw the mobilization meetings which forced all Politburo members to speak. This marked the launch of the Yan'an rectification movement, whose goal was "to destroy subjectivism and sectarianism and thereby save the party's cadres."

Wang proposed that Mao Zedong had always upheld "dialectical materialism", and that Liu Shaoqi had also, cementing the alliance between Mao and Liu. Wang also criticized those who were too embedded in theory and lacked "practical work experience."

Mao in turn reciprocated Wang's attentions. Thomas Kampen calls a speech by Mao at the Seventh Party Congress of 1945 "very interesting," given that he advocated Wang's entry to the Central Committee and spoke of Wang (and Ren Bishi's) contributions to the cause after their arrival in the Soviet area. (Mao again in October 1966 praised Wang Jixiang "for he approved of the battle at Donggu." Kampen writes: "It demonstrates that Mao was grateful for Wang's support and remembered the event for decades."

Zhang Wentian was demoted and his title taken away by Mao although he was a puppet. But when Wang lost his using value to Mao, his being purged was inevitable. During the Yan'an Rectification Movement, Wang was labeled as representative of dogmatism along with Wang Ming and Zhang, and had to make a public confession and apologies. This was not the end of his humiliation. In the 7th National Congress of CCP held in 1945, Wang was even driven out of the Central Committee of CCP, which he had  held the position for last decade. Perhaps Mao felt it was too harsh as he appealed to all delegates and it was under his insistence that Wang was elected as an alternate member of Central Committee as a comfort.

Northeast Assignment 
During the Chinese Civil War, Wang was sent to northeast China to work with Lin Biao and Gao Gang, but only as their subordinate with the titles of Minister of City Organization Department and acting Minister of Propaganda Department of Northeast Bureau of CCP.

After Liberation 
After the establishment of People's Republic of China in 1949, Wang was appointed as first Chinese Ambassador to Soviet Union, and then Under Secretary of Foreign Ministry. In 1951 Wang was appointed as Minister of External Communication Department of CCP. Although Wang received another promotion in being elected as Commissioner and Secretariat of Central Committee of CCP in the 1st Plenary Meeting of 8th National Congress of CCP in 1956 and survived longer in political life than his close friend Zhang Wentian, who was purged in the Lushan Meeting in 1959, he still could not survive the Cultural Revolution.

Wang's wife Zhu Zhongli (朱仲丽) used to be a nurse working for the army and once was assistant of Canadian doctor Bethune who worked for 8th Route Army as an international volunteer. They lived together for several decades after marriage. Now Zhu is an active writer writing memoirs on Jiang Qing and Mao Zedong.

References

External links 

 About Wang Jiaxiang, from Ministry of Foreign Affairs of the People's Republic of China
 "Wang Jiaxiang: 1st ambassador of new China2, from China Daily
 1962: The Eve of the Left Turn in China’s Foreign Policy by Niu Jun

1906 births
1974 deaths
Chinese Communist Party politicians from Anhui
Politicians from Xuancheng
Republic of China politicians from Anhui
People's Republic of China politicians from Anhui
Ambassadors of China to the Soviet Union
Moscow Sun Yat-sen University alumni
Members of the Secretariat of the Chinese Communist Party
Institute of Red Professors alumni
People from Jing County, Anhui